Dendrobium schoeninum, commonly known as the common pencil orchid, is an epiphytic or sometimes a lithophytic orchid in the family Orchidaceae and has thin wiry, upright or pendent stems with fleshy, grooved, dark green leaves. Its short flowering stems have one or two, rarely up to four pale green, cream-coloured or mauve flowers with purple markings on the labellum. It grows on rainforest margins in coastal New South Wales and southern Queensland.

Description 
The side lobes are narrow and upright and the middle lobe turns downward and has wavy edges and three wavy ridges in the midline. Flowering occurs from August to November.

Taxonomy and naming
Dendrobium schoeninum was first formally described in 1870 by John Lindley and the description was published in The Gardeners' Chronicle and Agricultural Gazette. The specific epithet (schoeninum) is derived from the Latin word schoenus meaning "sedge".

Distribution and habitat
The common pencil orchid grows on the edge of rainforest, near creeks or on the branches of river oak (Casuarina cunninghamiana) or swamp she-oak (C. glauca). It sometimes also grows on shady rocks and cliff faces. It occurs in near coastal areas between Gladstone in Queensland and the Hunter River in New South Wales.

References 

schoeninum
Orchids of New South Wales
Orchids of Queensland
Epiphytic orchids
Plants described in 1846